Colpixys is a genus of hymenopteran insects of the family Eulophidae.

References

Key to Nearctic eulophid genera 
Universal Chalcidoidea Database

Eulophidae